General Barber may refer to:

Charles Williams Barber (1872–1943), U.S. Army brigadier general
Colin Muir Barber (1897–1964), British Army lieutenant general

See also
Attorney General Barber (disambiguation)